Cliff Jackson (born c. 1937) is a former Canadian football player who played for the Edmonton Eskimos. He played college football at the North Carolina Central University. Jackson was drafted by the Chicago Bears in the last round of the 1959 NFL Draft, but did not play in the league.

References

1930s births
Living people
Canadian football running backs
North Carolina Central Eagles football players
Edmonton Elks players